Battery Records is a hip-hop label started by Neil Levine under Zomba Label Group, which is currently owned by Sony Music Entertainment.  The label was launched mid-2008 by Sony BMG Music Entertainment.  The label primarily focuses on new talent, often overseeing early-stage development for acts that are destined for other labels such as J Records or Jive.  However, it also serves established artists looking for non-traditional deals, such as releasing Q-Tip's long-awaited solo album Kamaal the Abstract, which had been shelved nearly seven years prior.

Artists
6 Tre G
Ace Valentine
Chalie Boy
D.C. Don Juan
GS Boyz
Li'l Goonie
Louisiana Ca$h
The Party Boyz
Q-Tip
Sir Will
Sunny Valentine
Velaté
V.I.C.
Mickey Factz
S Dub "The Greatest"

Discography

External links
Battery Records official site

See also
List of record labels
Zomba Label Group
Jive Records

References

Record labels established in 2008
Hip hop record labels
American record labels
Sony Music
Zomba Group of Companies subsidiaries